Boucher is a French surname.

List of people with surname Boucher

A–G
Adrian Boucher (c. 1760–1804), French architect
Alexandre Boucher (1770–1861), French violinist
Alfred Boucher (1850–1934), French sculptor
Andrée Boucher (1937–2007), Canadian municipal politician
Anouk Leblanc-Boucher (born 1984), Canadian Olympic speed skater
Anthony Boucher (1911–1968), American fiction author
Arthur Boucher (1870–1948), Wales international rugby union player
Billy Boucher (1899–1958), Canadian professional ice hockey player
Brian Boucher (born 1977), American professional ice hockey player
Butterfly Boucher (born 1979), Australian singer-songwriter
Candice Boucher (born 1983), South African model
Céline Boucher (born 1945), Canadian artist
Charles Boucher (disambiguation), multiple people
Charles Boucher de Boucherville (1822–1915), Canadian provincial politician, third Premier of Quebec
Charles Hamilton Boucher (1898–1951), Knighted Major-General in the British Indian Army during World War II
Chris Boucher (writer) (born 1943), British writer
Chris Boucher (basketball) (born 1993), Saint Lucia-born Canadian basketball player
Claire Boucher (born 1988), Canadian artist; better known as Grimes
Claude Boucher (diplomat), Canadian diplomat
Claude Boucher (politician) (born 1942), former member of the Quebec National Assembly
Daniel Boucher (musician) (born 1971), Canadian musician
Daniel Boucher (politician), Canadian municipal politician
David Boucher (born 1980), French road cyclist
Dillon Boucher (born 1975), New Zealand professional basketball player
Donovan Boucher (born 1961), Jamaican/Canadian boxer of the 1980s, '90s and 2000s
Eric Reed Boucher (born 1958), American punk musician, better known as Jello Biafra
Étienne-Alexis Boucher, current member of the Quebec National Assembly, son of Claude Boucher (politician)
Frank Boucher (1902–1977), Canadian professional ice hockey player
François Boucher (1703–1770), French painter
Gaétan Boucher (born 1958), Canadian Olympic speed skater
Gene Boucher (1933–1994), American operatic baritone
Georges Boucher (1896–1960), Canadian professional ice hockey player
Grayson Boucher (born 1984), American professional streetball (basketball variant) entertainer
Guy Boucher (born 1971), Canadian professional ice hockey coach

H–Z
H. A. Boucher (1921–2009), American politician
Hélène Boucher (1908–1934), French pilot
Jack Boucher (1931–2012), American photographer
Jacques Boucher de Crèvecœur de Perthes (1788–1868), French geologist and antiquary
James Boucher (1910–1995), Irish cricketer
Jean Boucher (artist) (1870–1939), French sculptor
Jean Boucher (politician) (1926–2011), member of the Canadian house of Commons
Jonathan Boucher (1738–1804), English clergyman, teacher and philologist
Judy Boucher (born 1938), Caribbean-English singer
Louis-Charles Boucher de Niverville (1825–1869), Canadian lawyer and national politician
Marcel Boucher (1898–1965), French-American entrepreneur
Marin Boucher (c. 1587 – 1671), French colonist of Quebec, Canada; ancestor to most Bouchers in North America, particularly in Quebec
Mark Boucher (born 1976), South African cricketer
Maurice Boucher (1953–2022), Canadian convicted criminal
Maurice Le Boucher (1882–1964), French organist, composer, and pedagogue
Merle Boucher (born 1946), American state politician
Nick Boucher (born 1980), Canadian ice hockey player
Philippe Boucher (born 1973), Canadian professional ice hockey player
Pierre Boucher de la Bruère (1837–1917), Canadian lawyer, journalist, author and provincial politician
Pierre Boucher (1622–1717), French-Canadian clergyman and governor of New France
Richard Boucher (born 1951), American government official
Rick Boucher (born 1946), American national politician
Robert Boucher (disambiguation), multiple people
Ron Boucher, Australian rules footballer
Sandy Boucher (born 1936), American author, Buddhist and feminist
Savannah Smith Boucher (born 1943), American actress
Sebastien Boucher (born 1981), Canadian minor league baseball player
Sherry Boucher (born 1945), American actress
Sylvie Boucher (born 1962), Canadian national politician
Tom Boucher (1873–unknown), English footballer
Zacharie Boucher (born 1992), French footballer

Fictional characters
Bobby Boucher (portrayed by Adam Sandler), protagonist of the 1997 comedy film The Waterboy

See also
Boucher (disambiguation)

French-language surnames
Occupational surnames